A number of musical works are available in the Esperanto language. The phrase "Esperanto music" is sometimes used to include music which is about Esperanto.

Classical music 
 Lou Harrison, who incorporated styles and instruments from many world cultures in his music, used Esperanto titles and/or texts in several of his works, most notably La Koro-Sutro (1973).
 David Gaines used Esperanto texts for his Symphony No. 1 (Esperanto) for mezzo-soprano and orchestra (1994–98) and Povas plori mi ne plu (I Can Cry No Longer) for unaccompanied SATB choir (1994).
 Montagu C. Butler
 The opera Sternenhoch by Ivan Acher is sung in Esperanto.

Musicians, singers and bands 
 Dolchamar
 Jean-Marc Leclercq (JoMo)
 Jonny M, a reggae and rap music singer-songwriter
 Kim J. Henriksen
 Kajto
 La Perdita Generacio
 Merlin
 Martin & La Talpoj
 Persone

Songs 
 "La Espero"
 3000 songs in a Songwiki

Music companies and publishers 
 ESP-Disk
 Vinilkosmo
 Floréal Martorell
 Brazila-Esperanto-Ligo
 Edistudio
 Nigra Kato
 Rusa Esperantista Unio

Events and projects 
 Vinilkosmo kompil'
 Kolekto 2000
 Esperanto Subgrunde kompil'
 FESTO (Esperanto meeting)

References to Esperanto in music 

 Slovak band TEAM released an entire album in Esperanto.
 "The Crystal Theme" from the opening of Final Fantasy XI was sung in Esperanto ("Memoro de la Ŝtono")
 Kurt Elling wrote a vocalese song called "Esperanto" based on the Vince Mendoza composition "Esperança". Elling explains on his album Live in Chicago (Blue Note) that the lyrics were written while he was under the impression that it was titled "Esperanto" and only later found out the original title, which is the Portuguese word for 'hope'.
 The second album of former German hip hop crew Freundeskreis was titled "Esperanto". The same-called lead track was also released as a single.
 A Russian band Tesla Coil released an album GV in 2014. Lyrics are partially in Esperanto. There is also a song which has a name in Esperanto - "Kirasa Kerno" (Armored Core).

See also 
 Music Portal

References 

 
Articles containing video clips